1-2-3 Corona is an East German film directed by Hans Müller. It was released in 1948.

Plot
In ruined Berlin, several bands of abandoned children roam the streets, engaging in petty crimes. When a circus arrives nearby, the boys are charmed by one trapeze performer called Corona. They are upset when the circus' manager insults her, and plan a revenge by setting a trap on the ring. But their scheme fails and it is Corona that is injured. Being unable to work, she is dismissed.  
The boys tend to her, and as time passes, she teaches them her art, and they form a little circus of their own. A manager of another circus offers Corona a job. She is reluctant to leave the children. Eventually, the manager takes them all in into his circus.

Cast
 Eva Ingeborg Scholz as Corona
 Lutz Moik as Gerhard Wittmann
 Piet Clausen as Dietrich
 Ralph Siewert as Fritzchen
 Walter Werner as Doctor Waldner
 Annemarie Hase as Frau Schmittchen
 Herbert Hübner as Professor Hanke
 Hans-Edgar Stecher as Heinz
 Horst Gentzen as Emil
 Werner Müller as Carl
 Hans Neie as Rudi
 Eduard Wandrey as Hugo Grandini
 Hans Leibelt as Circus Manager Barlay

Production
The script writers were inspired by a real children's circus, Rose, that was a popular attraction in the city of Pößneck during the first post-war years.  1-2-3 Corona was the first DEFA picture to be filmed in UFA's old studio in Potsdam-Babelsberg, which was turned into the DEFA Feature Films Studio. Outdoor photography took place in Charlottenburg and Prenzlauer Berg.

Reception
1-2-3 Corona had its premiere in East Berlin's Babylon Cinema. It was viewed by some eight million people. The Catholic Film Service defined it as a "realistic picture, managing to create an entertaining film with modest resources."

Author Peter Pleyer regarded it as a classical "Rubble film", that "tried to provide some optimism".

References

External links

1-2-3 Corona original poster on ostfilm.de.
1-2-3 Corona on DEFA Sternstunden.

1948 films
DEFA films
1940s German-language films
German black-and-white films
Circus films
Films set in Berlin
German crime drama films
1948 crime drama films